Altukhovo is an urban locality (urban-type settlement) in Navlinsky District of Bryansk Oblast, Russia. Population:

References

Notes

Sources

Urban-type settlements in Bryansk Oblast
Sevsky Uyezd